Thrash Anthems is an album released by the German thrash metal band Destruction on January 19, 2007. It is a compilation of re-recordings of old songs and two new songs: "Deposition (Your Heads Will Roll)" and "Profanity".

The limited digipak edition includes one bonus track ("Eternal Ban") and a video clip for "Total Desaster". The 2-LP version does not include the bonus track and the running order of the tracks is partly different. A sequel to this album titled Thrash Anthems II was released in November 2017 and features a compilation of other classic songs that have been newly re-recorded.

Track listing

Credits 
Writing, performance and production credits are adapted from the album's liner notes.

Personnel 
Destruction
 Schmier – bass, lead vocals
 Mike Sifringer – guitars
 Marc Reign – drums, backing vocals

Guest musicians
 Harry Wilkens – guitar solo on "Release from Agony", "Cracked Brain"
 Jacob Hansen – guitar solo on "Death Trap", "Invincible Force"
 V.O. Pulver – guitar solo on "Unconscious Ruins"

Additional musicians
 V.O. Pulver – backing vocals
 Franky Winkelmann – backing vocals
 Harry Wilkens – backing vocals
 Andre Grieder – backing vocals
 Ramona Götz – backing vocals

Production
 Destruction – production
 V.O. Pulver – engineering
 Gero Krenz – engineering
 Franky Winkelmann – engineering
 Jacob Hansen – mixing, mastering

Artwork and design
 Marco Schirmer – artwork
 Katja Piolka – photography

Studios 
 House of Music Studios, Winterbach, Germany – recording
 Little Creek Studio, Gelterkinden, Switzerland – recording
 Hansen Studios, Ribe, Denmark – mixing, mastering

References 

2007 albums
AFM Records albums
Destruction (band) albums